The Convention on the Prevention and Punishment of the Crime of Genocide (CPPCG), or the Genocide Convention, is an international treaty that criminalizes genocide and obligates state parties to pursue the enforcement of its prohibition. It was the first legal instrument to codify genocide as a crime, and the first human rights treaty unanimously adopted by the United Nations General Assembly, on 9 December 1948, during the third session of the United Nations General Assembly. The Convention entered into force on 12 January 1951 and has 152 state parties .

The Genocide Convention was conceived largely in response to World War II, which saw atrocities such as the Holocaust that lacked an adequate description or legal definition. Polish-Jewish lawyer Raphael Lemkin, who had coined the term genocide in 1944 to describe Nazi policies in occupied Europe and the Armenian genocide, campaigned for its recognition as a crime under international law. This culminated in 1946 in a landmark resolution by the General Assembly that recognized genocide as an international crime and called for the creation of a binding treaty to prevent and punish its perpetration. Subsequent discussions and negotiations among UN member states resulted in the CPPCG.

The Convention defines genocide as any of five "acts committed with intent to destroy, in whole or in part, a national, ethnical, racial or religious group." These five acts were: killing members of the group, causing them serious bodily or mental harm, imposing living conditions intended to destroy the group, preventing births, and forcibly transferring children out of the group. Victims are targeted because of their real or perceived membership of a group, not randomly. The convention further criminalizes complicity, attempt, or incitement of its commission'. Member states are prohibited from engaging in genocide and obligated to pursue the enforcement of this prohibition. All perpetrators are to be tried regardless of whether they are private individuals, public officials, or political leaders with sovereign immunity.

The CPPCG has influenced law at both the national and international level. Its definition of genocide has been adopted by international and hybrid tribunals, such as the International Criminal Court, and incorporated into the domestic law of several countries. Its provisions are widely considered to be reflective of customary law and therefore binding on all nations whether or not they are parties. The International Court of Justice (ICJ) has likewise ruled that the principles underlying the Convention represent a peremptory norm against genocide that no government can derogate. The Genocide Convention authorizes the mandatory jurisdiction of the ICJ to adjudicate disputes, leading to international litigation such as the Rohingya genocide case and dispute over the 2022 Russian invasion of Ukraine.

Definition of genocide
Article 2 of the Convention defines genocide as

Article 3 defines the crimes that can be punished under the convention:

The convention was passed to outlaw actions similar to the Armenian genocide and the Holocaust.

The first draft of the Convention included political killing, but the USSR along with some other nations would not accept that actions against groups identified as holding similar political opinions or social status would constitute genocide, so these stipulations were subsequently removed in a political and diplomatic compromise.

Early drafts also included acts of cultural destruction in the concept of genocide, but these were opposed by former European colonial powers and some settler countries. Such acts, which Lemkin saw as part and parcel of the concept of genocide, have since often been discussed as cultural genocide (a term also not enshrined in international law). In June, 2021, the International Criminal Court issued new guidelines for how cultural destruction, when occurring alongside other recognized acts of genocide, can potentially be corroborating evidence for the intent of the crime of genocide.

Parties

, there are 152 state parties to the Genocide Convention—representing the vast majority of sovereign nations—with the most recent being Mauritius, on 8 July 2019; one state, the Dominican Republic, has signed but not ratified the treaty. Forty-four states have neither signed nor ratified the convention.

Despite its delegates playing a key role in drafting the convention, the United States did not become a party until 1988—a full forty years after it was opened for signature—and did so only with reservations precluding punishment of the country if it were ever accused of genocide. These were due to traditional American suspicion of any international authority that could override US law. U.S. ratification of the convention was owed in large party to campaigning by Senator William Proxmire, who addressed the Senate in support of the treaty every day it was in session between 1967 and 1986.

Reservations

Immunity from prosecutions
Several parties conditioned their ratification of the Convention on reservations that grant immunity from prosecution for genocide without the consent of the national government:

Application to non-self-governing territories

Several countries opposed this article, considering that the convention should apply to Non-Self-Governing Territories:
 Albania
 Belarus
 Bulgaria
 Hungary
 Mongolia
 Myanmar
 Poland
 Romania
 Russian Federation
 Ukraine

The opposition of those countries were in turn opposed by:
 Australia
 Belgium
 Brazil
 Ecuador
 China
 Netherlands
 Sri Lanka
 United Kingdom

Litigation

United States

One of the first accusations of genocide submitted to the UN after the Convention entered into force concerned the treatment of Black Americans. The Civil Rights Congress drafted a 237-page petition arguing that even after 1945, the United States had been responsible for hundreds of wrongful deaths, both legal and extra-legal, as well as numerous other supposedly genocidal abuses. Leaders from the Black community and left activists William Patterson, Paul Robeson, and W. E. B. Du Bois presented this petition to the UN in December 1951. It was rejected as a misuse of the intent of the treaty. Charges under We Charge Genocide entailed of Lynching of more than 10,000 African Americans with an average of more than 100 per year- with full number could not be confirmed  at the time due to unreported murder cases.

Former Yugoslavia 
The first state and parties to be found in breach of the Genocide convention were Serbia and Montenegro, and numerous Bosnian Serb leaders. In Bosnia and Herzegovina v. Serbia and Montenegro, the International Court of Justice presented its judgment on 26 February 2007. It cleared Serbia of direct involvement in genocide during the Bosnian war. International Tribunal findings have addressed two allegations of genocidal events, including the 1992 Ethnic Cleansing Campaign in municipalities throughout Bosnia, as well as the convictions found in regards to the Srebrenica Massacre of 1995 in which the tribunal found, "Bosnian Serb forces committed genocide, they targeted for extinction, the 40,000 Bosnian Muslims of Srebrenica ... the trial chamber refers to the crimes by their appropriate name, genocide ...". Individual convictions applicable to the 1992 Ethnic Cleansings have not been secured however. A number of domestic courts and legislatures have found these events to have met the criteria of genocide, and the ICTY found the acts of, and intent to destroy to have been satisfied, the "Dolus Specialis" still in question and before the MICT, UN war crimes court, but ruled that Belgrade did breach international law by failing to prevent the 1995 Srebrenica genocide, and for failing to try or transfer the persons accused of genocide to the ICTY, in order to comply with its obligations under Articles I and VI of the Genocide Convention, in particular in respect of General Ratko Mladić.

Myanmar

Myanmar has been accused of Genocide against its Rohingya community in Rakhine State after around 800,000 Rohingya fled at gunpoint to neighbouring Bangladesh in 2016 and 2017, while their home villages were systematically burned. The International Court of Justice has given its first circular in 2018 asking Myanmar to protect its Rohingya from genocide. Myanmar's civilian government was overthrown by the military on 1 February 2021; since the military is widely seen as the main culprit of the genocide, the coup presents a further challenge to the ICJ.

Ukraine

Russian accusations of genocide by Ukraine 
In February 2022, Russia invaded Ukraine, claiming that it acted, among other reasons, in order to protect Russian-speaking Ukrainians from genocide. The unfounded and false Russian charge that has been widely condemned, and has been called by genocide experts accusation in a mirror, a powerful, historically recurring, form of incitement to genocide. 

In response, Ukraine filed a lawsuit under the Genocide Convention, alleging that Russia was misusing an allegation of genocide in order to justify an illegal invasion. On 16 March, the International Court of Justice issued an interim measure, declaring that no acts of genocide had occurred in Donetsk and Luhansk oblasts of Ukraine, and ordering Russia to immediately cease its military operations in Ukraine.

Russian atrocities in Ukraine 

Russian forces committed numerous atrocities and war crimes in Ukraine, including all five of the potentially genocidal acts listed in the Genocide Convention. Canada, Czechia, Estonia, Ireland, Latvia, Lithuania, Poland, and Ukraine have accused Russia of genocide. In April 2022 Genocide Watch issued a genocide alert for Ukraine. A May 2022 report by 35 legal and genocide experts concluded that Russia has violated the Genocide Convention by the direct and public incitement to commit genocide, and that a pattern of Russian atrocities implies the intent to destroy the Ukrainian national group, and the consequent serious risk of genocide triggers the obligation to prevent it on signatory states.

See also 

 List of parties to the Genocide Convention
 States parties to the Rome Statute of the International Criminal Court
 Rome Statute
 List of genocides by death toll

References

Further reading

 Tams, Christian J.; Berster, Lars; Schiffbauer, Björn (2014). Convention on the Prevention and Punishment of the Crime of Genocide – A Commentary, C.H. Beck / Nomos / Hart Publishing, 
 Henham, Ralph J.; Chalfont, Paul; Behrens, Paul (Editors 2007). The criminal law of genocide: international, comparative and contextual aspects, Ashgate Publishing, Ltd.,  p. 98

 Introductory note by William Schabas and procedural history note on the Genocide Convention in the Historic Archives of the United Nations Audiovisual Library of International Law

Human rights instruments
United Nations treaties
International criminal law treaties
Genocide
Treaties concluded in 1948
Treaties entered into force in 1951
Treaties of the Kingdom of Afghanistan
Treaties of the People's Socialist Republic of Albania
Treaties of Algeria
Treaties of Andorra
Treaties of Antigua and Barbuda
Treaties of Argentina
Treaties of Armenia
Treaties of Australia
Treaties of Austria
Treaties of Azerbaijan
Treaties of the Bahamas
Treaties of Bahrain
Treaties of Bangladesh
Treaties of Barbados
Treaties of the Byelorussian Soviet Socialist Republic
Treaties of Belgium
Treaties of Belize
Treaties of Bolivia
Treaties of Bosnia and Herzegovina
Treaties of the Second Brazilian Republic
Treaties of the People's Republic of Bulgaria
Treaties of Burkina Faso
Treaties of Myanmar
Treaties of Burundi
Treaties of the French protectorate of Cambodia
Treaties of Canada
Treaties of Chile
Treaties of the People's Republic of China
Treaties of the Republic of China (1949–1971)
Treaties of Colombia
Treaties of the Comoros
Treaties of Costa Rica
Treaties of Ivory Coast
Treaties of Croatia
Treaties of Cuba
Treaties of Cyprus
Treaties of the Czech Republic
Treaties of Czechoslovakia
Treaties of the Republic of the Congo (Léopoldville)
Treaties of Denmark
Treaties of Dominica
Treaties of Ecuador
Treaties of the Kingdom of Egypt
Treaties of El Salvador
Treaties of Estonia
Treaties of the Ethiopian Empire
Treaties of Fiji
Treaties of Finland
Treaties of the French Fourth Republic
Treaties of Gabon
Treaties of the Gambia
Treaties of Georgia (country)
Treaties of West Germany
Treaties of East Germany
Treaties of Ghana
Treaties of the Kingdom of Greece
Treaties of Guatemala
Treaties of Guinea
Treaties of Guinea-Bissau
Treaties of Haiti
Treaties of Honduras
Treaties of Iceland
Treaties of India
Treaties of Pahlavi Iran
Treaties of the Iraqi Republic (1958–1968)
Treaties of Israel
Treaties of Italy
Treaties of Jamaica
Treaties of Jordan
Treaties of Kazakhstan
Treaties of Kuwait
Treaties of Kyrgyzstan
Treaties of the Kingdom of Laos
Treaties of Latvia
Treaties of Lebanon
Treaties of Lesotho
Treaties of Liberia
Treaties of the Libyan Arab Jamahiriya
Treaties of Liechtenstein
Treaties of Lithuania
Treaties of Luxembourg
Treaties of Malaysia
Treaties of the Maldives
Treaties of Mali
Treaties of Mauritius
Treaties of Mexico
Treaties of Moldova
Treaties of Monaco
Treaties of the Mongolian People's Republic
Treaties of Montenegro
Treaties of Morocco
Treaties of the People's Republic of Mozambique
Treaties of Namibia
Treaties of Nepal
Treaties of the Netherlands
Treaties of New Zealand
Treaties of Nicaragua
Treaties of North Korea
Treaties of Norway
Treaties of Pakistan
Treaties of Panama
Treaties of Papua New Guinea
Treaties of Paraguay
Treaties of Peru
Treaties of the Philippines
Treaties of Portugal
Treaties of North Macedonia
Treaties of the Socialist Republic of Romania
Treaties of the Soviet Union
Treaties of Rwanda
Treaties of Saint Vincent and the Grenadines
Treaties of Saudi Arabia
Treaties of Senegal
Treaties of Serbia and Montenegro
Treaties of Yugoslavia
Treaties of Seychelles
Treaties of Singapore
Treaties of Slovakia
Treaties of Slovenia
Treaties of South Africa
Treaties of South Korea
Treaties of Francoist Spain
Treaties of the Dominion of Ceylon
Treaties of the Republic of the Sudan (1985–2011)
Treaties of Sweden
Treaties of Switzerland
Treaties of the Syrian Republic (1930–1963)
Treaties of Tanzania
Treaties of Togo
Treaties of Tonga
Treaties of Trinidad and Tobago
Treaties of Tunisia
Treaties of Turkey
Treaties of Uganda
Treaties of the Ukrainian Soviet Socialist Republic
Treaties of the United Arab Emirates
Treaties of the United Kingdom
Treaties of the United States
Treaties of Uruguay
Treaties of Uzbekistan
Treaties of Vietnam
Treaties of South Yemen
Treaties of the Yemen Arab Republic
Treaties of Zimbabwe
Treaties of Ireland
Treaties of Cape Verde
Treaties of South Vietnam
1948 in France
Treaties adopted by United Nations General Assembly resolutions
Treaties extended to Bermuda
Treaties extended to the British Virgin Islands
Treaties extended to Guernsey
Treaties extended to Jersey
Treaties extended to the Falkland Islands
Treaties extended to Gibraltar
Treaties extended to the Isle of Man
Treaties extended to the Turks and Caicos Islands
Treaties extended to the Pitcairn Islands
Treaties extended to Saint Helena, Ascension and Tristan da Cunha
Treaties extended to Norfolk Island
Treaties extended to Ashmore and Cartier Islands
Treaties extended to the Australian Antarctic Territory
Treaties extended to Heard Island and McDonald Islands
Treaties extended to the Cocos (Keeling) Islands
Treaties extended to Christmas Island
Treaties extended to the Coral Sea Islands
Treaties extended to Greenland
Treaties extended to the Faroe Islands
Treaties extended to the Nauru Trust Territory
Treaties extended to the Territory of Papua and New Guinea
Treaties extended to the Belgian Congo
Treaties extended to Ruanda-Urundi
Treaties extended to the Colony of the Bahamas
Treaties extended to British Dominica
Treaties extended to the Colony of Fiji
Treaties extended to British Grenada
Treaties extended to British Saint Lucia
Treaties extended to British Saint Vincent and the Grenadines
Treaties extended to the Crown Colony of Seychelles
Treaties extended to the Kingdom of Tonga (1900–1970)
Treaties extended to British Hong Kong
Treaties extended to Portuguese Macau
Treaties extended to West Berlin
Treaties of the Hungarian People's Republic
Treaties of the Polish People's Republic